The Evans Ship Canal was excavated in Buffalo, New York, from 1832–1834.

References

Transportation buildings and structures in Buffalo, New York
Canals in New York (state)
Canals opened in 1834
Transportation buildings and structures in Erie County, New York